Cattybrook Brickpit is a  geological Site of Special Scientific Interest near the village of Almondsbury, South Gloucestershire, notified in 1989. It began as a clay pit and brickworks.

History 
The Cattybrook Brick Company was established in 1864. In 1903 Cattybrook also acquired the nearby Shortwood Brickworks. From 1972, they were taken over by the Ibstock Group.

The brickworks are located immediately to the North of the Bristol and South Wales Union Railway, then under construction through the Severn Tunnel. By the end of 1883, the tunnel's enormous demand for bricks with which to line the tunnel was taking 100,000 bricks per month from Cattybrook. This was only a small proportion of the tunnel's need though and three other brickworks were supplying the tunnel, 1,200,000 per month in total. After completion of the tunnel, these brickworks and their masons were unemployed, leading to an over-supply of cheap bricks in the area and the first speculative housing developments in the new railway villages such as Rogiet and Pilning.

Notable buildings and structures using Cattybrook bricks 
Notable buildings and structures built using Cattybrook bricks include
 Jacobs Wells Baths, a former public baths in Bristol
 Maidenhead Viaduct, a railway bridge across the River Thames in Maidenhead
 Montpelier High School, a girls secondary school in Bristol
 Severn Tunnel, a railway tunnel under the Severn Estuary between England and Wales
 The Granary, a distinctive building in Bristol built in the Bristol Byzantine style
 Merthyr Tydfil Town Hall, a municipal building

References 

Sites of Special Scientific Interest in Avon
Sites of Special Scientific Interest notified in 1989
Buildings and structures in South Gloucestershire District
Brickworks in the United Kingdom